Sericoderus lateralis is a species of minute hooded beetle in the family Corylophidae. It is found in Africa, Australia, Europe and Northern Asia (excluding China), North America, and Southern Asia.

References

Further reading

External links

 

Corylophidae
Articles created by Qbugbot
Beetles described in 1827